Ibrahim Arafat Mensah (born 11 January 1995) is a Ghanaian professional footballer who plays for Slovan.

Career
On 16 August 2018, IK Start announced the signing of Mensah from NK Aluminij. After a half year at the club, it was announced on 13 March 2019 that Mensah's contract had been terminated by mutual consent.

Career statistics

Club

References

External links
NZS profile 

1995 births
Living people
Ghanaian footballers
Association football wingers
Association football forwards
NK Bravo players
NK Krško players
NK Aluminij players
IK Start players
NK Triglav Kranj players
Slovenian PrvaLiga players
Eliteserien players
Slovenian Second League players
Ghanaian expatriate footballers
Expatriate footballers in Portugal
Ghanaian expatriate sportspeople in Portugal
Expatriate footballers in Slovenia
Ghanaian expatriate sportspeople in Slovenia
Expatriate footballers in Norway
Ghanaian expatriate sportspeople in Norway